Chinese singer Jane Zhang has embarked on five concert tours during her solo career, two of which have been worldwide.

Concert tours

One-off concerts

Promotional concerts

Fan meeting concerts

Performances at national events

Performances at award shows

Performances on television shows and specials

References 

 
Lists of concert tours